School Spirits is an American paranormal documentary television series which aired on the Syfy channel. The series premiered on June 20, 2012, and aired through August 1, 2012. The series features alleged paranormal encounters told through reenactments that are based on occurrences at schools and universities in America.

Summary
The series focuses on purported paranormal experiences told by students and professors at their respective schools and universities. Each episode begins with the introduction:

Tagline: 
Promo intro:

Episodes

See also
 Ghost hunting
 List of reportedly haunted locations in the world
 List of reportedly haunted locations in the United States
 Paranormal television

References

External links
Spirits at syfy.com

Syfy original programming
Paranormal television
Television series about ghosts
2010s American documentary television series
2012 American television series debuts
Television series featuring reenactments
2012 American television series endings

fi:Aavejahti